Alfred Sydney North (7 February 1906 – September 1988) was a British water polo player who competed in the 1936 Summer Olympics.

He was part of the British team which finished eighth in the 1936 tournament. He played four matches as goalkeeper.

See also
 Great Britain men's Olympic water polo team records and statistics
 List of men's Olympic water polo tournament goalkeepers

References

External links
 

1906 births
1988 deaths
Water polo goalkeepers
British male water polo players
Olympic water polo players of Great Britain
Water polo players at the 1936 Summer Olympics